Bell Hill is an unincorporated community and census-designated place (CDP) in Clallam County, Washington, United States. The population was 837 at the 2010 census, up from 731 at the 2000 census. Located just south of the city of Sequim, Bell Hill has become a fast-growing destination for the very wealthy, with a high population of Californians who found success in high tech businesses. Although Sequim is not affluent, it is known for its low levels of rain, a quality that has made Bell Hill very attractive. Bell Hill gets somewhat more precipitation than Sequim but is drier than most western Washington areas.

Based on per capita income, one of the more reliable measures of affluence, Bell Hill ranks 21st of 522 areas in the state of Washington to be ranked. It is also the highest rank achieved in Clallam County.

Geography
Bell Hill is located in eastern Clallam County at  (48.064705, -123.093364), bordered to the north by the city of Sequim. Bell Hill actually has two peaks, or hillocks. The Western hillock  is relatively exposed, while the eastern hillock is forested with Douglas fir and Pacific madrone (madrone).

Demographics 
As of the census of 2000, there were 731 people, 325 households, and 259 families residing in the CDP. The population density was 262.4 people per square mile (101.2/km2). There were 347 housing units at an average density of 124.6/sq mi (48.0/km2). The racial makeup of the CDP was 95.21% White, 1.50% Native American, 1.09% Asian, 0.27% Pacific Islander, 0.14% from other races, and 1.78% from two or more races. Hispanic or Latino of any race were 0.96% of the population.

There were 325 households, out of which 17.2% had children under the age of 18 living with them, 73.8% were married couples living together, 3.7% had a female householder with no husband present, and 20.3% were non-families. 16.6% of all households were made up of individuals, and 7.4% had someone living alone who was 65 years of age or older. The average household size was 2.25 and the average family size was 2.46.

In the CDP, the age distribution of the population shows 13.8% under the age of 18, 3.1% from 18 to 24, 13.8% from 25 to 44, 36.3% from 45 to 64, and 33.0% who were 65 years of age or older. The median age was 57 years. For every 100 females, there were 94.4 males. For every 100 females age 18 and over, there were 94.4 males.

The median income for a household in the CDP was $66,442, and the median income for a family was $85,595. Males had a median income of $42,083 versus $25,250 for females. The per capita income for the CDP was $35,568. About 5.3% of families and 8.5% of the population were below the poverty line, including 13.4% of those under age 18 and 6.8% of those age 65 or over.

References

External links
 Sequim Weather Camera located on top of Bell Hill Water Reservoir

Census-designated places in Clallam County, Washington
Census-designated places in Washington (state)